Vicky Bharat Chandhok is an Indian racing driver and motorsport administrator who was born on April 7, 1957. From 2003 to 2005 and from 2010 to 2013, he served as president of the Federation of Motor Sports Clubs of India (FMSCI). He helped bring the Indian Grand Prix Formula 1 races to India during his second term as president of the Indian federation. As a representative of the FIA and Bernie Ecclestone, he also oversaw the construction of the F1 track at Buddh International Circuit. He also served as a consultant for Jaypee Sports International (JPSI), the company that built and owned the Formula One track. He currently serves on the FIA Truck Racing Commission and the FMSCI Council. Additionally, he has won multiple Indian rallying titles. Karun Chandhok, India's second F1 driver, is the son of Indu Chandhok, a founding member of the FMSCI and the Madras Motor Sports Club (MMSC).

In 1982, Chandhok wed Chitra, and they had two sons: Suhail Chandhok and Karun Chandhok. Bharat Indu Chandhok, the second son of Lala Indersain Chandhok, not only participated in Sholavaram races but was also an active participant in the founding of FMSCI and MMSC. His grandfather, Lala Indersain Chandhok, was an avid enthusiast who sowed the seeds of motorsports in the family.

Chandhok made his debut as a driver in a modified Ambassador in Sholavaram in 1972. He continued to race in the 1970s and 1980s and participated for many years in the Indian National Rally Championship. He quit racing and rallying in 2000 after 28 years, having won over 350 awards. After a five-year hiatus, he competed in the South India Rally in 2000, which he won in a Mitsubishi Lancer that had just made its debut in Indian rallying. Sandeep Lal was his co-driver, and Manoj Dalal, his long-time navigator, was the event's Clerk of the Course. He made a brief comeback in 2018 by competing in the South India Rally 2018 at the age of 61. He and co-driver Chandramouli finished third in the INRC1 category.

Chandhok established the Wallace Sports and Research Foundation in 1989 to train rally and race drivers. Akbar Ebrahim, who went on to become the president of FMSCI, was one of the first students at the Wallace Foundation. Under Wallace's direction, Ebrahim competed in his first race at the brand-new Madras Motor Sport Track.

References 

Indian motorsport people
1957 births
Living people
Indian racing drivers
Indian rally drivers